224th may refer to:

224th (Parachute) Field Ambulance, a Royal Army Medical Corps unit of the British airborne forces during the Second World War
224th Battalion, CEF, a unit in the Canadian Expeditionary Force during the First World War
224th Joint Communications Support Squadron (JCSS), provides deployable tactical communications for JTF and JSOTF Headquarters
224th Sustainment Brigade (United States), a sustainment brigade of the United States Army and the California Army National Guard

See also
224 (number)
224, the year 224 (CCXXIV) of the Julian calendar
224 BC